D. Neil Reid (March 30, 1900January 22, 1981) was a Michigan politician.

Early life 
Reid was born on March 30, 1900, in a part of Redford Township, Michigan which is now Detroit. Reid attended Northwestern High School. Reid worked for Redford State Savings Bank until 1921, when he started attending the University of Michigan where he would earn a bachelor's degree in 1924 and then a Bachelor of Laws in 1926. In 1927, Reid would start practicing law. In 1933, he started a law firm by the name of Reid & Young with Leslie P. Young.

Political career 
In 1936, Reid was a delegate to the Republican National Convention from Michigan. In 1944, Reid would run to for a Michigan House of Representatives seat representing the Wayne County 1st district unsuccessfully. On November 5, 1946, Reid would successfully run for this position, and serve in this position from January 1, 1947 to January 1, 1949. He failed to gain re-election in 1948, and again ran unsuccessfully for this seat in 1950.

Personal life 
Reid married Laura Elizabeth Craft in 1928. Together they had three children. Reid was a Freemason, a member of the Knights Templar, and a member of the Kiwanis.

Death 
Reid died on January 22, 1981, in Detroit, Michigan. He is interred at Grand Lawn Cemetery in Detroit.

References

1900 births
1981 deaths
American Freemasons
Republican Party members of the Michigan House of Representatives
Michigan lawyers
People from Redford, Michigan
University of Michigan alumni
20th-century American politicians
20th-century American lawyers